A Question of Guilt is a 1996 Hardy Boys and Nancy Drew Supermystery crossover novel.

Plot summary
In Philadelphia, Nancy Drew and the Hardy Boys find themselves on opposite sides of a high-profile murder case – a case that has already come to court and been tried. Carson Drew's client was cleared on a technicality, but the Drews want to prove him innocent beyond all doubt, while the Hardys want to find conclusive evidence of his guilt.

References

External links
A Question of Guilt at Fantastic Fiction
A Question of Guilt at Goodreads
Supermystery series books

Supermystery
1996 American novels
1996 children's books
Novels set in Philadelphia